Jahnatal is a municipality in the district of Mittelsachsen in Saxony in Germany. It was established on 1 January 2023 with the merger of the municipalities of Ostrau and Zschaitz-Ottewig.

Geography

Boroughs
Jahnatal consists of the following villages:

 Auerschütz
 Auterwitz
 Baderitz
 Beutig
 Binnewitz
 Clanzschwitz
 Delmschütz
 Döhlen
 Dürrweitzschen
 Glaucha
 Goselitz
 Jahna
 Kattnitz
 Kiebitz
 Lüttewitz
 Lützschnitz
 Merschütz
 Mischütz
 Möbertitz
 Münchhof
 Niederlützschera
 Noschkowitz
 Oberlützschera
 Obersteina
 Ostrau
 Ottewig
 Pulsitz
 Rittmitz
 Schlagwitz
 Schmorren
 Schrebitz
 Sömnitz
 Töllschütz
 Trebanitz
 Zschaitz
 Zschochau
 Zunschwitz

History
On 1 January 2023, the municipalities of Ostrau and Zschaitz-Ottewig merged to form the new municipality of Jahnatal.

References 

Mittelsachsen
2023 establishments in Germany